The following is a list of Swedish hip hop artists:

Rappers and crews
(in alphabetical order)

 1.Cuz (Swedish)
 Adaam (Swedish)
 Adam Tensta (English)
 Addis Black Widow (English)
 Afasi & Filthy (Swedish)
 Ant Wan (Swedish)
 Bladee (English)
 Cleo (Swedish)
 Dani M (Swedish)
 Dollar Bill (Swedish) 
 Dree Low (Swedish)
 Ecco2K (English)
 Einár (Swedish)
 Fronda (Swedish)
 Greekazo (Swedish)
 Hov1 (Swedish)
 Highwon (Swedish) 
 Infinite Mass (Swedish) 
 Just D (Swedish)
 Kartellen (Swedish) 
 Ken Ring (Swedish) 
 Kumba
 Labyrint (Swedish) 
 Lazee (English) 
 Lilla Namo
 Linda Pira (Swedish)
 Looptroop (Swedish, English) 
 Mange Schmidt (Swedish) 
 Medina (Swedish/Arabic) 
 Maskinen (Swedish) 
 Mohammed Ali (Swedish) 
 Movits! (Swedish)
 Näääk (Swedish/Finnish)
 Newkid (Swedish)
 Papa Dee (English) 
 Petter (Swedish) 
 Promoe (Swedish) 
 Rebstar (English) 
 Roffe Ruff (Swedish)
 Silvana Imam (Swedish)
 Snook (Swedish) 
 Stonefunkers (Swedish)
 Stor (Swedish) 
 Supersci (English) 
 Svenska Akademien (Swedish) 
 Swingfly (English) 
 The Latin Kings (Swedish, Spanish) 
 Thomas Rusiak (English, Swedish)
 Timbuktu (Swedish, English)
 VC Barre (Swedish)
 Yasin (Swedish)
 Yung Lean (English)
 Zacke (Swedish)

DJs

 Embee

Producers

 
 Embee
 Jimmy Ledrac
 Vladi Vargas
 Quincy Jones III (English)
 Ilya
 Yung Gud

See also
 Swedish hip hop
 European hip hop
 Music of Sweden
 List of Swedes in music

References

Swedish music-related lists
Swedish
Hip hop musicians